Cube Interactive is a privately owned interactive media and entertainment company founded in 2005 by Wil Stephens.

In 2013, Cube co-produced with Boom Pictures, the UK’s first two-screen play-along TV format for kids and in 2014, created and co-produced the first interactive TV format for CBBC, Ludus. 
Ludus has won wide industry recognition for its innovative format winning a Broadcast Digital Award and a Bafta Games Cymru award.

In 2016, Cube launched its latest interactive television format, Alfi.

The Company now acts as an investment holding company and operates through its independently owned and managed network of companies.

Productions
 Y Lifft (2013)
Catchphrase (2013)
Dipdap (2014)
 Ludus (2014)
 The Visor (2014)
 Alfi (2016 - pre-production)
 The Platform (2016 - pre-production)

Awards and Accolades

 Won: Bafta Cymru award for Cyw (2007)
 Nominated: Bafta Children's for Y Lifft (2013)
 Nominated: Broadcast Digital Award for Dipdap (2014)
 Won: Broadcast Digital Award for Ludus (2014)
 Nominated: Bafta Children's for Cyw a'r Wyddor (2014)
 Nominated: Bafta Children's for Madron (2014)
 Nominated: Bafta Children's for Ludus (2014)
 Won: Bafta Cymru Games award for Madron (2014)
 Won: Bafta Cymru Games award for Ludus (2014)
 Won: Bafta Cymru Games award for Teletubbies (2016)

References

External links
 

British companies established in 2005
Technology companies established in 2005
Mass media companies established in 2005
Mass media companies of the United Kingdom
Technology companies of the United Kingdom
Companies based in the City of London
2005 establishments in Wales